Zeineb or Zejneb is a Bosnian female given name, transliterated from the Arabic name Zaynab, and may refer to:
Zeineb Benzina, Tunisian archeologist

Bosniak feminine given names

tr:Zeynep